, born July 17, 1993) is a Japanese idol, fashion model, actress and a former member of female idol group Idoling!!!.

Life and career 
Ai Okawa was born on July 17, 1993, in Amagasaki, Hyogo, Japan. She is the youngest of three children; she has two older brothers. Okawa joined idoling!!! as a third-generation member in 2009 and quickly established herself as one of the most popular members of Idoling!!!. She is known as an active participant of sports event within the group, especially sumo and badminton tournament. In 2012, she made her modeling debut for an influential Japanese fashion magazine JJ. She has walked the runway at Tokyo Girls Collection, Kobe Collection, Kansai Collection, Tokyo Runway and Girls Award. In April 2015, Okawa became the Saturday weather presenter for "Going! Sports & News" on Nippon Television Network.

References

External links 
 Ai Okawa｜lespros entertainment
 藍 Love You Official blog
 idoling!!! official site

Japanese female models
Japanese gravure models
Japanese idols
21st-century Japanese actresses
Japanese women pop singers
Japanese television personalities
Living people
1993 births
Idoling!!! members
Musicians from Hyōgo Prefecture